The eleventh season of Two and a Half Men premiered on CBS on September 26, 2013, and ended on May 8, 2014. This season marks another major change in the series as Amber Tamblyn joins the cast as Jenny, Charlie's illegitimate daughter.  Tamblyn was promoted to series regular on October 2, 2013. This season is also the first and only season not to feature Angus T. Jones, who portrayed Jake Harper during the first ten seasons, in any capacity. He would return the following season as a guest star in the show's final episode.

Production
Angus T. Jones was originally downgraded to a recurring cast member this season while he attended college; however, on March 18, 2013, Jones officially confirmed that he would not return for season 11. In his absence, the series introduced Amber Tamblyn, who portrays Jenny, the illegitimate, lesbian daughter of Charlie Harper. It had been announced on May 30, 2013 that a female character was to be added to the show and that producers were looking for a woman to play the part. Tamblyn's addition to the cast was confirmed on August 7, 2013, and she made her first appearance in the season premiere. Although the role was initially announced as a series regular, it was later announced to be a recurring role, with the option to become a series regular later. On October 2, 2013, Tamblyn was promoted to series regular. Ashton Kutcher had nothing but praise for Tamblyn, calling her "amazing." Holland Taylor, who only appeared in one episode last season, appears in more episodes this season.

Amber Tamblyn joined the cast as the new "half man", replacing Angus T. Jones.
This is also the first season not to feature an opening sequence with the three leads singing along to the theme song "Manly Men". Instead, the opening titles features the shortened version of the theme with the show's title against a black background (a slide that has been frequently used throughout the series).

Lynda Carter guest starred in the episode "Justice in Star-Spangled Hot Pants", playing a closeted lesbian version of herself. The episode's plot was inspired by a meeting Carter had with Jon Cryer, who is a fan of her. Country singer Brad Paisley, whose wife Kimberly Williams-Paisley had a recurring guest role during the season, appeared in the season finale. Mila Kunis, Ashton Kutcher's wife, guest starred in the episode "Lan Mao Shi Zai Wuding Shang".

Cast

Main
 Ashton Kutcher as Walden Schmidt
 Jon Cryer as Alan Harper 
 Amber Tamblyn as Jenny
 Conchata Ferrell as Berta

Recurring
 Holland Taylor as Evelyn Harper-Pepper
 Courtney Thorne-Smith as Lyndsey McElroy
 D. B. Sweeney as Larry Martin
 Clark Duke as Barry Foster
 Kimberly Williams-Paisley as Gretchen Martin
 Aly Michalka as Brooke
 Odette Annable as Nicole
 Brooke D'Orsay as Kate

Guest
 Carl Reiner as Marty Pepper
 Edie McClurg as Helen
 Jennifer Aspen as Stephanie
 Lynda Carter as herself
 Mimi Rogers as Robin Schmidt
 Jeff Probst as himself
 Cal Worthy III as Kevin
 Mike Cera as Nicholas
 Madison Dylan as Laurie
 Spencer Locke as Jill
 Melanie Lynskey as Rose
 Brian Stepanek as Arthur
 Paula Marshall as Paula
 Kate Miner as Nadine
 Diane Farr as Rachel
 Marion Ross as Margaret, Jeff Probst's grandmother
 Brooke Lyons as Gwen
 Tim Conway as Tim
 Steve Lawrence as Steve
 Garry Marshall as Garry
 Marin Hinkle as Judith Harper-Melnick
 Mila Kunis as Vivian
 Jane Lynch as Dr. Linda Freeman
 Ken Davitian as Mr. Mardirosian
 Jamie Luner as Tracy
 Alex Kapp Horner as Donna
 Sandra Purpuro as Cynthia
 Diedrich Bader as Dirk
 Brad Paisley as Derek

Episodes

Critical reception
Sam Moore of Yahoo said: "Despite the criticisms and cast breakdowns, Two and a Half Men keeps surviving, and in my opinion, the show right now is the best it has ever been. Amber Tamblyn has helped breathe life into a show that always seems on the verge of the guillotine and her impact on the show, for me, has been huge and much welcomed." Due to Tamblyn's character being gay, the show received praise from the LGBT community who said "The folks who produce Two and a Half Men should be applauded for their efforts to raise some LGBT awareness amidst the often-madcap goings-on in their shows" and that "it keeps getting better and better".

The Gazette gave a positive review, especially for Kutcher, saying "I think Ashton Kutcher is doing a great job on Two and a Half Men." They also praised the "new  LGBT angles the show has added." Overall they said the show "has never been better."
They later praised the "new and contemporary directions the show is taking". They felt that this season could be remembered as "its finest", they also said it was "one of few shows that makes me laugh nowadays", and they hoped that the show gets renewed for another season. They said that "Two and a Half Men is brilliant, in a silly sort of way."

The Canadian online edition of TV Guide noted after the season finale only that the series had "come a long way" and that the series was no longer the reviewer's "cup of tea."

On Metacritic, the series has a 'User Score' of 3.4 (out of 10), and a summary of the results is: "Generally unfavorable reviews based on 71 ratings".

Ratings

U.S. Nielsen and DVR ratings

References

General references 
 
 
 

Season 11
2013 American television seasons
2014 American television seasons